Silambattam is a 2008 Indian Tamil-language action film written and directed by cinematographer-turned-director S. Saravanan, making his directorial debut. The film stars Silambarasan in dual roles while  Sana Khan, Sneha  and Prabhu play lead roles. Santhanam, Nedumudi Venu, Kishore, and Ponvannan play supporting roles with Premji Amaren in a special appearance. Yuvan Shankar Raja composed the film's background score and soundtrack. The film released on 18 December 2008. Silambattam opened to mixed reviews but was a commercial hit and gave a 100 day run.

Plot 

Vichu is a quiet village priest brought up by his maternal grandfather. Owing to specific reasons, the caring elder has purposefully toned down the young boy's emotional quotient and has taught him a peculiar art of living. As a result, Vichu is soft-spoken, passive, and is groomed to tolerate all sorts of malicious misdemeanors aimed at him. Vichu assists his grandfather in carrying out religious rituals as well as being the temple's caretaker. Vichu's only consolation comes in the company of his sweetheart Jaanu. Jaanu's childish jokes and teasing remarks make up for all the precious and youthful moments that Vichu has missed in his growing-up years. One day, Jaanu decides to seduce Vichu by tying a sacred thread on his hand which was intended to make him more brave with the help of his friend Kusu Vidum Saama. Due to this, he gets aroused after seeing Jaanu's navel and kisses it, causing her to squeal.

Though Vichu abides by his elder's advice, an incident in the temple premises reveals his real persona. One day, Vichu witnesses a big band of ruffians bashing a seemingly meek individual. Vichu joins the tussle and saves the victim. As the man takes a hard look at his savior face, he is stunned. He then meets Muthuvel, who is in jail for committing a murder and narrates what all happened. Muthuvel decides to meet Vichu. When he gets released, he goes to meet Vichu and finds him. When he goes towards Vichu, he gets stabbed by a thug, which Vichu and his grandfather witness. The thug's leader pushes Vichu's grandfather and goes to kill Muthuvel, but Vichu stops him. When he looks at Vichu he finds out that he was the one saved the victim that day. A fight occurs between Vichu and the thugs, where Vichu manages to defeat them and save Muthuvel. Vichu's grandfather sees this and gets shocked. Vichu admits Muthuvel in a hospital, where he hears his flashback form his grandfather.

There is a huge clash between the two village groups headed by Muthuvel and Veeraiyan. The reason is that Veeraiyan claims back all of the land that he donated to the landless and poor villagers, whereas Muthuvel and his brother Tamizharasan oppose his order. In the violent power-struggle, many people die. Veeraiyan stabs himself and says that Tamizh stabbed him to death. The police comes in search of Tamizh, but he is missing in the house (he is with Gayathri on that night on a freight train). Tamizh is produced before court, and as he was missing on that night, he is doubted and granted punishment. Gayathri intervenes and says that she spent that night along with Tamizh on that train. She says that they behaved as a husband and wife would in each other's company. The statement is proven, and Tamizh is released. Only Veeraiyan's last son Duraisingam and Muthuvel are spared in the tragedy. The burning intensity of the mishap stays alive in Durai's heart, and Muthuvel is another witness to the past. Durai enters Muthuvel's house and kills everyone, including Tamizh. A group of rowdies enter and kill the rest. Muthuvel, the dying Tamizh, and their men manage to kill them. It is revealed that Gayathri escapes to her father's home and later dies giving birth to Vichu as she believes that Vichu is Tamizh's rebirth. Vichu's grandfather did not want Vichu do become like Tamizh, and he should be seen by Muthuvel and his men. After finding out the past, Vichu decides to avenge Tamizh's death.

Vichu, along with Saama, Jaanu, and her parents, disguised as rich people, foil Durai's plan of making a beer factory in the land. Durai then goes to a train with a girl, Pottas Sivagami, and spends time with her. Saama sees this and calls the police, telling them that there is a bomb in the train, which everyone believes. When Durai's men come to tell him that there is a bomb in the train, Sivagami hears a deep sound and runs outside with Durai, and they are apprehended by the public. Then, Durai analyzes Vichu's trick. The villagers become angry at Durai, and his wife leaves him. Angered, Durai kills Muthuvel by placing a bomb in a tractor and kidnaps Vichu. He brings him to the same place where Veeraiyan died and hits him with his hands tied. Tamizh's men arrives there and tell Durai to untie and then beat Vichu. After Durai's henchmen untie Vichu, he hits Durai and his henchmen and defeats them. Vichu uses the villagers and Tamizh's men to kill Durai by throwing coconuts all over his body and thereby avenging Tamizh's and his family's death.

After completing his revenge, Vichu goes back to his grandfather's home. He later marries Jaanu, and they become parents to a boy who is angry like his father.

Cast 

 Silambarasan in a dual role as Vichu, a young, energetic Brahmin and Tamizharasan, Vichu's father.
 Sana Khan as Jaanu, Vichu's love interest who wants to make him more like a man should be.
 Prabhu as Muthuvel, Tamizh's elder brother and Vichu's paternal uncle who tells Tamizh's flashback story.
 Sneha as Gayathri Tamizharasan, a Brahmin girl who is Tamizh's wife and Vichu's mother in the flashback.
 Santhanam as Kusu Vidum Saama, a joking priest. He provides the comic relief in the film and plays a role in assisting Vichu to fight against the villain.
 Nedumudi Venu as Gayathri's father and Vichu's maternal grandfather. He does not want Vichu to be like his father Tamizh.
 Kishore as Duraisingham, the main antagonist.
 Ponvannan as Veeraiyan, Duraisingam's father and a leader who claims back all of the land that he donated to the landless and poor, but Muthuvel and Tamizh oppose his order.
 Karunas as Villager
 Vinayakan as Tamizh's best friend
 Manobala as Jaanu's father
 Nirosha as Jaanu's mother
 Yuvarani as Duraisingam's wife
 Raaghav as Veeraiyan's son
 S. N. Lakshmi as Thamizh & Muthuvel's grandmother
 Pragathi as Muthuvel's wife
 Ilavarasu as Police
 Mayilsamy as Priest
 Crane Manohar as Napoleon
 Sendrayan as Local Rogue
 Lollu Sabha Balaji as Duraisingam's PA
 Apoorva as a prostitute
 V. Swaminathan as Registrar
 S. S. Kumaran
 Chtti Babu
 Master Bharath
 Kanal Kannan as Pulippal Boopathy (cameo appearance)
 Premji Amaren as himself
 Antara Biswas as herself
 Rachana Maurya as herself
 Robert (special appearance in the song "Nallamdhana")
 Chaams (uncredited) as Ammanji

Production

Development 
In September 2007, early indications suggested that Lakshmi Movie Makers were set to make a film starring T. R. Silambarasan directed by Saravanan. Simbu confirmed the project and stating that he had put on weight and grew a beard for his participation in the project. Following the flop of Kaalai, Silambarasan started immediately to commencing his shoot for the film. The film was launched at AVM Studios on 7 December 2007. Silambattam was 25th film for "Lakshmi Movie Makers". The 40-member unit consisting of Silambarasan, director Saravanan, cameraman Mathi, action choreographer Kanal Kannan and a few stunt men from Chennai began their first schedule for a 10-day stint.

The crew shot schedules in Theni and Ooty and various other locations in South India during the filming. The film finished its talkie portion in early September 2008, and the song were canned in India as well as parts of Sri Lanka. The film, initially described as a "musical action comedy".

Casting 
Following the announcement of the project, Kajal Aggarwal was rumoured to be the heroine, following her successful role in Pazhani. However, due to differences, Kajal was ousted from the project due to her limited callsheets. However other indications claimed that Kajal was ousted from the project, even Bhavana and Shriya Saran were considered for the role. Then Sneha replaced Kajal Agarwal. Sana Khan was introduced as the one of the heroines of the project.
Nedumudi Venu was selected to play the role of the grandfather of Silambarasan, whilst Prabhu Ganesan was given a chance to make a cameo appearance in the film as Silambarasan's uncle. Supporting actors Santhanam, Karunaas and Premji Amaren also play roles in Silambattam. For a particular sequence, Simbhu donned the costume of Billa. Meenakshi of "Karuppusaamy Kuthagaithaarar" fame has committed for a single song.

Filming 
Simbhu was dancing for a song sequence at Usilampatti but due to his misfortune he sustained sprain injury in his ankle leading to the cancellation of the shooting. He was immediately rushed to a local hospital where he was administered treatment and was advised for the next couple of days.
Some scenes for Silambattam were shot in a small village called Thirukadaiyur near Kumbakonam district. Since the shooting in Thirukadaiyur is over, the Silambattam troop has now moved to Thiruvaiaru which is near Thirukadaiyur for shooting the next part. A grand set has been erected to depict a 'thiruvizha' scene and shooting is going on day and night. For a song sequence, a set was put up for a cost of Rs. 70 lakhs and it was picturized for 10 days. Sangita, who married Saravanan, helped her husband on Silambattam shooting.

Soundtrack 

The music of Silambattam was scored by Yuvan Shankar Raja. Initially Dhina was selected as the composer, before Silambarasan opted for his friend Yuvan Shankar Raja, with whom he has often worked together and has given very successful albums. The soundtrack was released on 21 March 2008, and features five songs, whilst lyrics were penned by 'Kavignar' Vaali, Gangai Amaran, Na. Muthukumar, Earl, Suzie Q. and Silambarasan himself. Already before the audio launch, three preview songs of the film were released online, "Nallamdhana", "Silambattam" and "Where is the Party". The songs from the albums were released in late September to four leading FM stations in Chennai, with one song per station, in attempt to popularize it before the official launch.

After the release, the songs gained much popularity especially among youth, with "Where is the Party" in particular, topping the charts for several weeks. The song and also the album featured in Top 10 lists, too. The album got three awards at the Isaiaruvi Tamil Music Awards 2008 in the categories, Sensational Youth Album, Crazy Song of the Year ("Where Is The Party") and Best Remix Song of the Year ("Vechikkava"). "Vechikkava" is a remix of the similarly-named song from the 1984 movie Nallavanukku Nallavan.

Release 
The satellite rights of the film were sold to Kalaignar. The film was given a "U/A" certificate by the Indian Censor Board. Originally scheduled to release on Diwali, but due to post-production works it was postponed to 12 December 2008.

Special screenings 
Silambarasan had a special screening with Ajith Kumar.

Critical reception 
Nowrunning wrote: "There is nothing to write home about in this routine film except that it is a wasted attempt by Silambarasan". Sify wrote: "Silambattam is a typical mass masala entertainer. It is another 'Formulaic' film revolving around a larger than life hero, who romances, does comedy". Hindu wrote: "What begins as a fairly suspenseful narrative dwindles into a run-of-the-mill line post-interval. Tales of vendetta have been churned out ever so many times". Kollywood today wrote: "On the whole, Silambattam is a flick that is better to avoid watching".

Awards 

 2009 International Tamil Film Awards
 Best New Actress - Sana Khan

 2009 Isaiyaruvi Tamil Music Awards
 Best Dancer - Silambarasan
 Rising Star Lyricist - Silambarasan - "Where is the Party"
 Best Remix Song of the Year - Yuvan Shankar Raja - "Vechukkava"
 Crazy Song of the Year - Yuvan Shankar Raja - "Where is the Party"
 Sensational Youth Album - Yuvan Shankar Raja - Silambattam
Best Choreography - Robert

 2009 Tamil Nadu State Film Awards
 Best Stunt Coordinator - Kanal Kannan

Nominations 
 2008 Vijay Awards
 Best Choreography - Robert

References

External links 
 
 

2008 films
2000s Tamil-language films
2000s masala films
Films scored by Yuvan Shankar Raja
2008 directorial debut films
Indian action drama films